Prodiame, also known as 17β-((3-aminopropyl)amino)estradiol, is a synthetic, steroidal estrogen and a 17β-aminoestrogen with anticoagulant effects that was first described in 1983 and was never marketed.

References

Phenols
Amines
Anticoagulants
Estranes
Synthetic estrogens